Roy William Selleck (born 22 February 1944) is a former Australian rules footballer who played with Richmond in the Victorian Football League (VFL).

The son of Roy Selleck Sr., Selleck later played 75 games with Sandringham from 1965 to 1969.

Notes

External links 
		
		
Roy Selleck's playing statistics from The VFA Project
		

1944 births
Living people
Australian rules footballers from Victoria (Australia)
Richmond Football Club players
Sandringham Football Club players